MediaInspector is Greece's and Cyprus's largest radio and television airplay monitoring service, providing real time reporting, music charts and statistical tools for radio and television broadcasters, artists, record companies, advertising agencies, rightholders, intellectual property rights organizations, and music industry analysts. It currently monitors more than 400 radio stations and several television channels.
In 2011 became the official IFPI partner for generating Greece's TOP200 airplay chart (replacing in Nielsen's Music Control). In 2013 its airplay chart was used at Mad Video Music Awards for the "Most popular song of the year.".

See also
 IFPI Greece

References

External links 
 Official Website
 http://www.ifpi.gr/links_el.html
 https://web.archive.org/web/20130608183947/http://www.videomusicawards.gr/news.php

Radio in Greece
Television in Greece